Santiago Lazcano (8 March 1947 in Errezil – 3 February 1985 in San Sebastián) was a Spanish cyclist. He debuted as a professional in 1969 and rode both the Vuelta a España and Tour de France that year. He finished 10th overall in the 1972 Giro d'Italia and his best season was 1973 as he won the Spanish mountain championship, the  Villafranca Grand Prix and took 5th overall in the 1973 Giro d'Italia. In 1974 he won stage 17, a high mountain stage in the Giro d'Italia and he finished 10th overall in the 1975 Vuelta a España. He retired as a pro cyclist in 1976 after an accident with a car at a race in The Netherlands. Following his retirement he occasionally commentated on the radio and on a regional TV show called 6 Hours of Euskadi. He died in a motorcycle accident close to his home in Azpeitia.

Major results

1968
2nd Overall Vuelta a Cantabria
1969
1st Overall Vuelta a Cantabria
1972
1st GP Pascuas
2nd Giro dell'Emilia
2nd GP Vizcaya
1973
1st Prueba Villafranca de Ordizia
5th Overall Giro d'Italia
1974
1st Stage 7 Giro d'Italia
8th Overall Tour de Suisse
1975
1st Stage 2 Grand Prix du Midi Libre
3rd Subida a Arrate
3rd GP Vizcaya
1976
1st Overall Vuelta a Asturias
2nd Overall Vuelta a Cantabria

Grand Tour general classification results timeline

References

1947 births
1985 deaths
Spanish male cyclists
People from Urola Kosta
Sportspeople from Gipuzkoa
Cyclists from the Basque Country (autonomous community)